The Germania Club Building, located at 108 W. Germania Place in the Near North Side community area of Chicago, Illinois, is the historic headquarters of the Germania Club, the oldest German-American organization in the city. The Germania Club was founded in 1865 as the Germania Männerchor, which formed to sing at Abraham Lincoln's funeral. The club built the Germania Club Building in 1889; it was designed by August Fiedler in an eclectic style featuring neoclassical and German Renaissance influences. The five-story building has a two-story limestone base with a portico and arched doorway on the south end. The upper stories feature arched windows capped by pediments and a pilaster supporting the cornice atop the building. The building includes a grand ballroom, banquet room, and restaurant and bar. The club played an important role in Chicago's German-American community, once the largest ethnic community in Chicago.

History

The Germania Club Building was added to the National Register of Historic Places on October 22, 1976. It was designated as a Chicago Landmark on January 13, 2011.

References

Buildings and structures completed in 1889
Clubhouses on the National Register of Historic Places in Chicago
German-American culture in Chicago
Chicago Landmarks